"Men of Harlech" or "The March of the Men of Harlech" is a song and military march which is traditionally said to describe events during the seven-year siege of Harlech Castle between 1461 and 1468, when the castle was held by the Lancastrians against the Yorkists as part of the Wars of the Roses. Commanded by Constable Dafydd ap Ieuan, the garrison withstood the longest known siege in the history of the British Isles. ("Through Seven Years" is an alternative name for the song.) The song has also been associated with the earlier, briefer siege of Harlech Castle about 1408, which pitted the forces of Owain Glyndŵr against the future Henry V of England.

"Men of Harlech" is important for Welsh national culture. The song gained international recognition when it was featured in the 1941 movie How Green Was My Valley and the 1964 film Zulu.

History

The music was first published without words during 1794 as "Gorhoffedd Gwŷr Harlech—March of the Men of Harlech" in the second edition of The Musical and Poetical Relicks of the Welsh Bards, but it is said to be a much earlier folk song. The earliest version of the tune to appear with lyrics, found thus far, comes from a broadside printed c. 1830. Since then, many different versions of the English lyrics have been published. It was published first with Welsh lyrics in Gems of Welsh Melody, edited by the Welsh poet, John Owen (Owain Alaw), published in London, England and Wrexham, Wales, during 1860. An edition containing Welsh and English lyrics was published in Ruthin, Wales, during 1862. The song was published in Volume II of the 1862 collection Welsh Melodies with the Welsh lyrics by the Welsh poet John Jones (Talhaiarn) and the English lyrics by Thomas Oliphant, President of the Madrigal Society. Another source attributes the Welsh words to the poet John Ceiriog Hughes, saying that they were first published during 1890, and that English words were first published during 1893, but this is clearly predated by the earlier publications; and in the case of Ceiriog's Welsh-language lyrics for the tune, they are to be found many years earlier, in Brinley Richards (ed.), The Songs of Wales (1873).

Use and versions of the song 
"Men of Harlech" is widely used as a regimental march, especially by British Army and Commonwealth regiments historically associated with Wales. Notably, it is the slow march of the Welsh Guards, the quick march of the Royal Welsh, and the march of the Royal Canadian Hussars (Montreal), The Governor General's Horse Guards, and The Ontario Regiment, for which it is the slow march.

It was first used for cinema during the titles of How Green Was My Valley (1941) and has featured in a number of other films. It is best known for its prominent role in the 1964 film Zulu, although the version of lyrics sung in it were written specially for the film. It is sung twice (once completely) in the film (the British open fire on the charging Zulus before the start of the final couplet), in counterpoint to the Zulu war chants and the pounding of their shields. Film editor John Jympson cut the scene to the song so that on either side of cuts where the British soldiers cannot be heard, the song is in the correct relative position. The song is also heard in the film Zulu Dawn, which is about the Battle of Isandlwana.

Rick Rescorla, Chief of Security for Morgan Stanley's World Trade Center office, sang a Cornish adaptation of "Men of Harlech" with a bullhorn, along with other anthems, to keep employee spirits high while they evacuated during the September 11 attacks. After helping save more than 2,700 employees he returned to the towers to evacuate others until the towers collapsed on him.

"Men of Harlech" was used as part of the startup music for ITV television station Teledu Cymru during the early 1960s and, until April 2006, in Fritz Spiegl's "BBC Radio 4 UK Theme".

From 1996 to 1999, HTV Wales used part of the song for Wales Tonight.

Adapted versions are sung by fans of several Welsh football clubs and as school or college songs around the world. There is a humorous parody known variously as "National Anthem of the Ancient Britons" and "Woad", written some time before 1914 by William Hope-Jones.

Bryn Terfel recorded "Men of Harlech" for his 2000 album We'll Keep a Welcome.

An English version of the song is sung before every Cardiff City home game.

Lyrics 
There are many versions of "Men of Harlech", and there is no single accepted English version. The version below was published in 1873.

John Oxenford version (published 1873) 

An earlier version is thus:-

Broadside version c. 1830, republished by Thomas Oliphant in 1862

Zulu version by John Barry Prendergast (1964)

Regimental Band lyrics

Welsh lyrics (by J. Ceiriog Hughes)

Wele goelcerth wen yn fflamio
A thafodau tân yn bloeddio
Ar i'r dewrion ddod i daro
Unwaith eto'n un
Gan fanllefau tywysogion
Llais gelynion, trwst arfogion
A charlamiad y marchogion
Craig ar graig a gryn.

Arfon byth ni orfydd
Cenir yn dragywydd
Cymru fydd fel Cymru fu
Yn glodus ym mysg gwledydd.
Yng ngwyn oleuni'r goelcerth acw
Tros wefusau Cymro'n marw
Annibyniaeth sydd yn galw
Am ei dewraf ddyn.

Ni chaiff gelyn ladd ac ymlid
Harlech! Harlech! cwyd i'w herlid
Y mae Rhoddwr mawr ein Rhyddid
Yn rhoi nerth i ni.
Wele Gymru a'i byddinoedd
Yn ymdywallt o'r mynyddoedd!
Rhuthrant fel rhaeadrau dyfroedd
Llamant fel y lli!

Llwyddiant i'n marchogion
Rwystro gledd yr estron!
Gwybod yn ei galon gaiff
Fel bratha cleddyf Brython
Y cledd yn erbyn cledd a chwery
Dur yn erbyn dur a dery
Wele faner Gwalia'i fyny
Rhyddid aiff â hi!

See also

Citations

General sources 
 "Men of Harlech" at the Volkslieder, German & Other Folk Songs Homepage

External links

 
 Free typeset sheet music—various arrangements from Cantorion.org
 Men of Harlech—various versions of lyrics
 English version of John Hughes (Ceiriog) lyrics
 Royal Regiment of Wales' Band singing "Men of Harlech" (2.68MiB MP3)—recording, using John Guard lyrics, in the church at Rorke's Drift, South Africa on the 120th anniversary of the Battle of Rorke's Drift.
 

18th-century songs
Cardiff City F.C.
Association football songs and chants
British military marches
Royal Welsh
Welsh Guards
Welsh patriotic songs
Wrexham A.F.C.
Welsh regiments of the British Army